"You Are My Love"  is a song with music by Constantine Callinicos and lyrics by Paul Francis Webster, written in 1953 and popularized by Mario Lanza.

1953 songs
Songs with lyrics by Paul Francis Webster
Mario Lanza songs